David Steen may refer to:

 David Steen (photographer) (1936–2015), English photographer
 David Steen (actor) (born 1954), American actor and writer
 Dave Steen (decathlete) (born 1959), Canadian decathlete
 Dave Steen (shot putter) (born 1942), Canadian shot putter
 David A. Steen, American biologist